This is the list of episodes for Bunnicula, an animated series based on the original books written by Deborah Howe and James Howe.

Series overview

Episodes

Season 1 (2016–17)

Season 2 (2017–18)

Season 3 (2018)

References

Lists of Cartoon Network television series episodes
Lists of American children's animated television series episodes
2010s television-related lists